Austin Dam failure may refer to:

Austin Dam failure (Pennsylvania), which occurred in 1911
Austin Dam failure (Texas), which occurred in 1900